Stonehouse (Bristol Road) railway station, also known as Stroudwater station after the nearby canal, was a station in Stonehouse, England, on the Bristol and Gloucester Railway between Haresfield and Frocester.

History

The station was called, first and unofficially, Eastington Road and then, officially, Bristol Road to distinguish it from a second station, Stonehouse (Burdett Road), which was on the Cheltenham and Great Western Union Railway, now the Golden Valley Line, between Gloucester and Swindon. Its proximity to the older Stroudwater Navigation, opened in 1779, led to this name also coming into local usage.

Bristol Road station was the junction for the Stonehouse and Nailsworth Railway's branch line to Nailsworth, which later had a small branch line of its own to Stroud. Unusually, the junction was to the north of Stonehouse (Bristol Road) station, and the branch line platform was a separate affair to the east of the main line station and connected by a covered pathway. The Nailsworth/Stroud branch lost its passenger services in 1947 as an economy measure, with official closure in 1949, though goods services remained until 1966.

Services to and from the Bristol Road station on the main line closed to passengers under the Beeching Axe in 1965 and to goods traffic the following year.  The redundant goods yard became the Stonehouse Coal Concentration Depot from 7 October 1966. It closed in 1989.

Reopening plans

In July 2017, plans were proposed to reopen the station, which would provide a fast link to Bristol. In September 2020, Stroud District Council announced that they had backed plans to reopen the railway station.

Services

References

External links
 Stonehouse (Bristol Road) Station - Stonehouse History Group

Stroud District
Former Midland Railway stations
Disused railway stations in Gloucestershire
Railway stations in Great Britain opened in 1844
Railway stations in Great Britain closed in 1965
1844 establishments in England
1965 disestablishments in England
Beeching closures in England